Awbridge is a small village and civil parish in the Test Valley district of Hampshire, England, about three miles northwest of Romsey, and near the River Test.  According to the 2001 census the parish, which includes the villages of Awbridge, Upper Ratley and Lower Ratley, had a population of 695, increasing to 712 at the 2011 Census.

It is within walking distance of Kimbridge, Dunbridge and Mottisfont, with Dunbridge providing a railway link to both Salisbury (to the north west) and Southampton (to the south).

Naming
Commonly the terms Upper and Lower Ratley are dropped, with locals referring to the entire area as Awbridge. Confusingly, the intersection through the village of its 3 main roads, location of the village school, and previously Post Office, is in Upper Ratley, and is denoted on Maps as such, with the mapped location of Awbridge being further towards Romsey than is generally accepted.

As if this naming ambiguity is not enough, there is often a 'Kent's Oak', listed on maps of the area as if this were also a location in its own right. It is a large oak tree in the corner of the school field, and despite its impressive size and age is no more than a local landmark, and not another village. As well though there exists a fine house, now a home for the elderly named Kent's Oak which was formerly a children's home run by Hampshire County Council. Adjacent is Little Kent's Oak - another house built in later years though of similar appearance yet smaller.

Locally, the name of the village is pronounced 'A-bridge', with the letter 'w' silent. This pronunciation can be the subject of some snobbery (and reverse-snobbery).

Attractions
Despite the small size of the village, there are a few notable attractions for visitors. 

Millennium Circle
The Millennium Circle, built by Bryan Raines from 2000 with a diameter exceeding 50 meters, sits on the intersection of two ley lines which are thought by druids to draw power between sites of geographical interest or historical monuments - in this case running between the Isle of Mann and Isle of Wight as well as a ley line from nearby Stonehenge. As a conservationist, Bryan reused builder's rubble to create the stones, arranging them gradually throughout the years to create the henge with stones for key moments in the year such as the summer and winter solstice and spring equinox.

Wildlife Sanctuary
Located adjacent to the aforementioned Millennium Circle, the Awbridge Wildlife Sanctuary includes a secluded woodland walking area and pond.

Church
The village church is All Saints Church which was originally designed by John Colson. It was completed in 1876 with construction starting the year before. The church was extended in 1993

References

External links
 
 

Villages in Hampshire
Test Valley